The Brazilian Navy operates six coastal minesweepers of the Aratu class.

Design 
Built in Germany in the 1970s by yacht-makers Abeking & Rasmussen, the wooden-hulled vessels are immune to magnetically-triggered mines.  They conduct missions through magnetic, mechanical and acoustic means.  Two shafts are powered by four Maybach diesel engines which produce 4,500 BHP, allowing the vessels to reach speeds of 24 knots.  They are fitted with a single 40mm 70-caliber Bofors anti-aircraft gun.

History

Ships
 M15 NV Aratu
 M16 NV Anhatomirim (decommissioned on December 5, 2016)
 M17 NV Atalaia
 M18 NV Araçatuba
 M19 NV Abrolhos (decommissioned on August 20, 2015)
 M20 NV Albardão (decommissioned on May 21, 2021)

References

http://www.deagel.com/Auxiliary-Vessels/Aratu_a002135001.aspx

Minesweepers of the Brazilian Navy
Mine warfare vessel classes